Professor Oscar C. Yatco (23 November 1930 – 1 July 2014) was a Filipino-born German conductor and violinist.

Early life
Yatco obtained his music teacher's diploma at the young age of 16 from the University of the Philippines in 1947. He trained with renowned teachers such as Ivan Galamian at Juilliard and with Wilhelm Stross at the State Academy of Music in Munich. He won top prizes in prestigious international competitions in Germany, and eventually performed as a soloist.

Music career
Yatco served as conductor, concert master, professor and music consultant for local orchestras such as the Manila Symphony Orchestra, the Cultural Centre of the Philippine Philharmonic Orchestra, and overseas in Hanover. Yatco commented in retrospect

See also
Michael Dadap
Andrea Veneracion

References

External links
http://www.manilatimes.net/national/2005/nov/21/yehey/life/20051121lif1.html
https://web.archive.org/web/20071028050121/http://www.manilatimes.net/national/2006/may/22/yehey/top_stories/20060522top4.html
http://www.opmdb.com/artist_profile.php?artist_id=1159 
http://www.clickthecity.com/arts/?p=61

Filipino conductors (music)
1930 births
2014 deaths
Filipino classical violinists
Filipino educators
Filipino expatriates in Germany
University of the Philippines alumni
Place of birth missing
Place of death missing
20th-century classical violinists
Recipients of the Presidential Medal of Merit (Philippines)
20th-century conductors (music)